Polyrhabda is a genus of flowering plants belonging to the family Amaranthaceae.

Its native range is Somalia.

Species:
 Polyrhabda atriplicifolia C.C.Towns.

References

Amaranthaceae
Amaranthaceae genera